This is a list of episodes for The Colbert Report in 2014, the final year of the series. The final episode aired on December 18, 2014.

2014

January

February

March

April

May

June

July

August

September

October

November

December

References

External links

 
 Lineups at Interbridge 
 

2014
2014 American television seasons
2014 in American television